Malachi Flynn (born May 9, 1998) is an American professional basketball player for the Toronto Raptors of the National Basketball Association (NBA). He played college basketball for the Washington State Cougars and the San Diego State Aztecs.

High school career
Flynn is the youngest of seven children. He stood 5'2 in his freshman season in high school, then grew to 5'6 as a sophomore before a growth spurt made him his current height of 6'1. As a senior at Bellarmine Prep, Flynn averaged 29.7 points, 6.0 rebounds and 4.0 assists per game, while shooting 48 percent from the floor. He earned a host of accolades, including The News Tribune's All-Area player of the year, Associated Press Washington player of the year, the Class 4A player of the year by the Washington Interscholastic Basketball Coaches Association, and the 4A Narrows League MVP as a senior. His 743 points as a senior set the single-season mark at Bellarmine Prep, and he finished with 1,625 career points, second to Abdul Gaddy. Flynn originally committed to Pacific before reopening his recruitment late in the signing period. He signed with the Washington State Cougars on April 13, 2016.

College career
In November 2016, Flynn scored 27 points in an 83–76 victory over Utah Valley, which is sixth most for a Cougar freshman in history. As a freshman at Washington State, he averaged 9.7 points per game and shot 38.7 percent from three-point range. Flynn averaged 15.8 points and 4.3 assists per game while shooting 41.3 percent from the field as a sophomore. He was the top player on a team that finished 12–19. Following the season, Flynn announced he was transferring. After receiving interest from Gonzaga, Texas A&M, Baylor and Creighton, Flynn signed with San Diego State in May 2018.

Coming into his redshirt junior season, Flynn was named the preseason Mountain West player of the year by Mountain West Wire. In a game in which he otherwise shot poorly, Flynn hit a last-second three-point shot on December 8 to defeat San Jose State 59–57. He was named to the midseason watchlist for the Wooden Award. On February 29, 2020, Flynn scored a career-high 36 points, the most by any Aztec since 2005, shooting 13-of-20 from the floor in an 83–76 comeback win over Nevada. At the conclusion of the regular season, Flynn was named Mountain West Player of the Year and Defensive Player of the Year. He averaged 17.6 points, 5.1 assists, and 4.5 rebounds per game. Following the season, Flynn declared for the 2020 NBA draft.

Professional career

Toronto Raptors (2020–present) 
Flynn was selected with the 29th pick in the first round of the 2020 NBA draft by the Toronto Raptors, the first San Diego State player to be drafted in the first round since Kawhi Leonard in 2011. He made his debut for the Raptors on December 23, 2020, playing one minute against the New Orleans Pelicans. On February 3, 2021, Flynn was assigned to the Raptors' NBA G League affiliate, the Raptors 905. On February 18, 2021, Flynn was recalled from his NBA G League assignment. On April 10, 2021, Flynn scored a then career-high 20 points and dished out a career-high 11 assists with two rebounds and steals in a 135–115 win against the Cleveland Cavaliers. On April 14, 2021, Flynn scored a new career-high 22 points with five rebounds, three assists and two steals in a 103–108 loss against the Atlanta Hawks. On May 4, 2021, Flynn was named Eastern Conference Rookie of the Month for April 2021.

On March 4, 2022, Flynn scored a season-high 20 points, alongside three rebounds and eight assists, in a 97–103 loss to the Orlando Magic.

Career statistics

NBA

Regular season

|-
| style="text-align:left;"| 
| style="text-align:left;"| Toronto
| 47 || 14 || 19.7 || .374 || .321 || .804 || 2.5 || 2.9 || .8 || .1 || 7.5
|-
| style="text-align:left;"| 
| style="text-align:left;"| Toronto
| 44 || 5 || 12.2 || .393 || .333 || .625 || 1.4 || 1.6 || .5 || .1 || 4.3
|- class="sortbottom"
| style="text-align:center;" colspan="2"| Career
| 91 || 19 || 16.1 || .380 || .326 || .750 || 2.0 || 2.3 || .6 || .1 || 6.0

Playoffs

|-
| style="text-align:left;"|2022
| style="text-align:left;"|Toronto
| 6 || 0 || 6.0 || .000 || .000 || — || .5 || .5 || .2 || .0 || .0
|- class="sortbottom"
| style="text-align:center;" colspan="2"|Career
| 6 || 0 || 6.0 || .000 || .000 || — || .5 || .5 || .2 || .0 || .0

College

|-
| style="text-align:left;"| 2016–17
| style="text-align:left;"| Washington State
| 31 || 30 || 33.1 || .395 || .387 || .735 || 2.9 || 2.9 || .7 || .0 || 9.7
|-
| style="text-align:left;"| 2017–18
| style="text-align:left;"| Washington State
| 31 || 30 || 33.4 || .413 || .338 || .846 || 3.4 || 4.3 || 1.6 || .1 || 15.8
|-
| style="text-align:left;"| 2018–19
| style="text-align:left;"| San Diego State
| style="text-align:center;" colspan="11"|  Redshirt
|-
| style="text-align:left;"| 2019–20
| style="text-align:left;"| San Diego State
| 32 || 32 || 33.4 || .441 || .373 || .857 || 4.5 || 5.1 || 1.8 || .1 || 17.6
|- class="sortbottom"
| style="text-align:center;" colspan="2"| Career
| 94 || 92 || 33.3 || .420 || .363 || .833 || 3.6 || 4.1 || 1.3 || .1 || 14.4

References

External links
San Diego State Aztecs bio
Washington State Cougars bio

1998 births
Living people
All-American college men's basketball players
American men's basketball players
Basketball players from Tacoma, Washington
Point guards
Raptors 905 players
San Diego State Aztecs men's basketball players
Toronto Raptors draft picks
Toronto Raptors players
Washington State Cougars men's basketball players